Loving Pablo, internationally known as Escobar, is a 2017 English-language Spanish biographical crime drama film directed by Fernando León de Aranoa, based on Virginia Vallejo's memoir Loving Pablo, Hating Escobar. It was screened out of competition in the 74th Venice International Film Festival and in the Special Presentations section at the 2017 Toronto International Film Festival.

Plot
Between 1983 and 1987, Colombian drug lord Pablo Escobar had a romantic relationship with the journalist and the television presenter, Virginia Vallejo.

Cast
 Javier Bardem as Pablo Escobar
 Penélope Cruz as Virginia Vallejo
 Peter Sarsgaard as Shepard, based on Steve Murphy
 Julieth Restrepo as Maria Victoria Henao
 David Valencia as Santos
 David Ojalvo as FBI Agent
 Giselle Da Silva as Olguita Arranz

Reception

Box office
Loving Pablo grossed $22,017 in the United States and Canada, and $17,5 million in other territories, plus $60,312 with home video sales.

Critical response
On review aggregator Rotten Tomatoes, the film holds an approval rating of 31% based on 48 reviews, with a weighted average rating of 4.82/10. The website's critical consensus reads, "Loving Pablo bungles its seemingly cinematic real-life story -- and a pair of talented stars -- in producing a lurid biopic that adds nothing to the Escobar subgenre." On Metacritic, the film has a weighted average score of 42 out of 100, based on 16 critics, indicating "mixed or average reviews".

References

External links
 
 

2017 films
2017 drama films
2017 biographical drama films
Spanish biographical drama films
English-language Spanish films
Films about Pablo Escobar
Cultural depictions of Pablo Escobar
Films directed by Fernando León de Aranoa
Films scored by Federico Jusid
Films set in the 1980s
Films set in Colombia
2010s English-language films
2010s Spanish films